Shir Hashirim ("Song of Songs") is a 1935 lost Yiddish-language film.

Cast 

 Samuel Goldenberg
 Dora Weissman
 Anna Toback
 Mierele Gruber

Production and release 

The film is based on the Shir Hashirim ("Song of Songs") operetta by Joseph Rumshinsky and Anshel Schorr. The low-budget Yiddish talkie, directed by Henry Lynn, intersperses English-language titles with the spoken dialogue. It was the first of six Yiddish films Lynn had been signed by the Empire Film Company to make. Variety estimated that the film cost ten to fifteen thousand dollars to produce.

The film premiered in October 1935 and has since been lost. It showed at New York's Acme Theatre in Union Square. Variety reported that the Acme's run lasted four days.

Reception 

Variety Wolfe Kaufman, after disparaging the whole of Yiddish film, wrote that the film's director was unworthy of the job.

References

Bibliography

Further reading 

 
 

American drama films
1930s American films